Serhiy Yevhenovych Husyev (born 1 July 1967 in Odessa) is a retired Ukrainian professional footballer. He was the Ukrainian top goalscorer in the second championship of 1992–93.

External links

 
 

1967 births
Living people
Soviet footballers
Ukrainian footballers
Ukraine international footballers
Ukrainian expatriate footballers
FC Chornomorets Odesa players
SKA Odesa players
CS Tiligul-Tiras Tiraspol players
Trabzonspor footballers
Altay S.K. footballers
Hapoel Be'er Sheva F.C. players
FC Zirka Kropyvnytskyi players
Ukrainian Premier League players
Ukrainian Second League players
Liga Leumit players
Ukrainian Premier League top scorers
Expatriate footballers in Israel
Expatriate footballers in Turkey
Expatriate footballers in Russia
Ukrainian expatriate sportspeople in Israel
Ukrainian expatriate sportspeople in Turkey
Ukrainian expatriate sportspeople in Russia
Association football forwards
K. D. Ushinsky South Ukrainian National Pedagogical University alumni
Footballers from Odesa